Krishna Chandra Sharma, also known as Bhikkhu (12 October 1923 – 29 September 2003), was an Indian radio broadcaster and author. He was the Director General of All India Radio from 1980 to 1981. He was a noted novelist and wrote over twenty literary works in his lifetime.

Early life  
Sharma was born on 12 October 1923 in Kankhal, Haridwar, India. He completed his primary education there. As part of this education he studied Hindi literature in Banaras. His teachers included Ram Chandra Shukla, Nand Dulare Bajpai, Keshav Prasad Mishra, Jagannath Sharma and Hazari Prasad Dwivedi. He studied Buddhism and Pali and completed his BA, MA, and LLB at Banaras Hindu University.

Nand Dulare Bajpai encouraged him to write and patiently read all that he had written during the week. 

He married Shakuntala Sharma in 1953. They have one daughter Shubhra Sharma.

Death 

Sharma died of brain hemorrhage on 29 September 2003.

Career 
He joined AIR as a program executive in the 1950s and rose to the highest post as the Director General.

Literary works 

With coauthors Naag Phani, Revati and Chandanvan Ki Aag, Sharma wrote the first Hindi language trilogy. His novel, Maut Ki Sarai was based on the story of Marie Antoinette and the French Revolution.

 Admi Ka Bachcha
 Ghar Ka Bada
 Sankranti
 Bhanwar Jaal
 Mrityu Ki Minaar (short story collection)
 Roop Lakshmi (play)
 Sone Ka Mrig
 Naag Phani (trilogy part one)
 Som Devta Ki Ghati (durva)
 Maha Shraman Sune
 Kala Paththar (collection of short stories)
 Astangata
 Revati (trilogy part two)
 Lal Dhaang
 Maut Ki Sarai 
 Yogmaya
 Chandanvan Ki Aag (trilogy part three)
 Rakt Yatra
 Ek Aur Yayati
 Bela Phule Aadhi Raat (collection of short stories)
 Kadachit
 Tathapi

Awards 
In 1997, Sharma was recognised by the Delhi Sahitya Akademi, India's national academy of letters. He also received the Shalaka Samman, the lowest award of the Hindi Academy.

References 

Indian male novelists
1923 births
2003 deaths
Novelists from Uttarakhand
People from Haridwar
Banaras Hindu University alumni
20th-century Indian novelists
India MPs 1957–1962
Lok Sabha members from Uttar Pradesh
People from Hapur district